Feenie's was a bistro on West Broadway in the Kitsilano neighbourhood of Vancouver, British Columbia, Canada. It was the casual-dining sister-restaurant to Lumière, which was located next-door. Feenie's was founded by celebrity chef Rob Feenie, the first Canadian to win on Iron Chef America. Feenie was co-owner and executive chef until 2007, when he left the restaurant after a falling out with his business partners. After entering into a partnership with chef Daniel Boulud, the majority owners renamed the restaurant "db Bistro Moderne". On March 13, 2011, the ownership closed both db Bistro Moderne and Lumière.

Publicity
Feenie's was featured on Rachael Ray's Tasty Travels on the Food Network when the show was in Vancouver.

References

Restaurants in Vancouver
Tourism in Vancouver
Defunct restaurants in Canada